Sašo Udovič (born 12 December 1968) is a Slovenian former professional footballer who played as a forward for Hajduk Split, KSK Beveren, Lausanne, and LASK. He made 42 appearances for the Slovenia national team and was a participant at the Euro 2000.

Career statistics

International 
Scores and results list Slovenia's goal tally first, score column indicates score after each Udovič goal.

References

External links
 Sašo Udovič at NZS 

1968 births
Living people
Footballers from Ljubljana
Yugoslav footballers
Slovenian footballers
Association football forwards
Slovenia international footballers
UEFA Euro 2000 players
Yugoslav First League players
Slovenian PrvaLiga players
Belgian Pro League players
Swiss Super League players
Austrian Football Bundesliga players
HNK Hajduk Split players
NK Ljubljana players
NK Svoboda Ljubljana players
NK Olimpija Ljubljana (1945–2005) players
K.S.K. Beveren players
FC Lausanne-Sport players
LASK players
Slovenian expatriate footballers
Slovenian expatriate sportspeople in Belgium
Expatriate footballers in Belgium
Slovenian expatriate sportspeople in Switzerland
Expatriate footballers in Switzerland
Slovenian expatriate sportspeople in Austria
Expatriate footballers in Austria